Nicolas Saint-Martin (August 10, 1753 – July 12, 1823) was a militia officer and political figure in Lower Canada. He is sometimes also referred to as Nicolas de Saint-Martin or Nicolas Gorge de Saint-Martin.

He was born Jacques-Nicolas Saint-Martin at Trois-Rivières in 1753, the son of a captain in the French navy who took part in the defence of Quebec City. Saint-Martin volunteered to serve in the British Army during the American invasion of 1775–6. He retired on half pay in 1783. In 1784, he married Marie-Louise, the daughter of seigneur Louis-Joseph Godefroy de Tonnancour. He was named justice of the peace for Trois-Rivières district in 1790 and was also served as commissioner for various public works projects in the region. He was elected to the 1st Parliament of Lower Canada for Trois-Rivières in 1792. Saint-Martin joined the local militia, becoming lieutenant-colonel in 1812, and served during the War of 1812.

In 1823, he died at Yamachiche after suffering an attack of paralysis the preceding year.

External links

Trifluviana. Volume 3:  Les députés des Trois-Rivières 1742-1808, F Surveyer & F-J Audet (1933)

1753 births
1823 deaths
Members of the Legislative Assembly of Lower Canada